The 1995 Direct Line International Championships was a women's tennis tournament played on grass courts at the Devonshire Park Lawn Tennis Club in Eastbourne in the United Kingdom that was part of Tier II of the 1995 WTA Tour. It was the 21t edition of the tournament and was held from 19 June until 25 June 1995.

Finals

Singles

 Nathalie Tauziat defeated  Chanda Rubin 3–6, 6–0, 7–5
 It was Tauziat's only singles title of the year and the third of her career.

Doubles

 Jana Novotná /  Arantxa Sánchez Vicario defeated  Gigi Fernández /  Natasha Zvereva 0–6, 6–3, 6–4
 It was Novotná's fifth doubles title of the year and the 55th of her career. It was Sánchez Vicario's fourth doubles title of the year and the 38th of her career.

References

External links
 ITF tournament edition details
 Tournament draws

Direct Line International Championships
Eastbourne International
Direct Line International Championships
Direct Line International Championships
1995 in English tennis